The 1912 United States presidential election in Connecticut  took place on November 5, 1912, as part of the 1912 United States presidential election which was held throughout all contemporary 48 states. Voters chose seven representatives, or electors to the Electoral College, who voted for president and vice president. 

Connecticut was won by the Democratic nominees, New Jersey Governor Woodrow Wilson and Indiana Governor Thomas R. Marshall. Wilson and Marshall defeated incumbent President William Howard Taft, and his running mate Vice President James S. Sherman and Progressive Party candidates, former President Theodore Roosevelt and his running mate California Governor Hiram Johnson. 

Wilson won Connecticut by a narrow margin of 3.28%, becoming the first Democratic presidential candidate since Grover Cleveland in 1892 to win the state.

While Taft lost the state, his 35.88% of the popular vote made it his fifth strongest state in terms of popular vote percentage after Utah, New Hampshire, Vermont and New Mexico. Connecticut was also the only northeastern state where Socialist Eugene V. Debs received over 5% of the vote.

As of 2020, this was the most recent presidential election in which the Democratic nominee carried the town of Monroe.

Results

Results by town

See also
 United States presidential elections in Connecticut

Notes

References

Connecticut
1912
1912 Connecticut elections